Buenavista is a ward (barrio) of Madrid belonging to the district of Carabanchel.

Wards of Madrid
Carabanchel